Here Come the Waves is a 1944 American romantic comedy musical film directed by Mark Sandrich. It stars Bing Crosby and Betty Hutton.

Plot
The film opens with naval scenes and a chorus of WAVES singing ‘The Navy Song’ on stage, and continues with a sister act, the Allison Twins (both played by Betty Hutton), singing the same song in a night club. Identical, except that one is blonde the other brunette, they are temperamentally very different. Susie, the blonde, is brash and scatter-brained, while Rosemary is serious and reliable. They leave their night club job to join the WAVES although Susie is extremely reluctant to do so. She is infatuated with popular singer Johnny Cabot (played by Bing Crosby) and fears that by joining the service she will never be able to meet him. Taking her collection of his records with her, however, she locks herself in the barracks washroom and plays Johnny’s record of ‘Moonlight Becomes You’.

The twins attend a show in which Johnny is starring and on-stage he sings ‘That Old Black Magic’. Back stage he finds an old friend, Windy Smith (Sonny Tufts), who has joined the Navy and Johnny explains that his own application has been refused because he is colour-blind. Together they visit the ‘21 Club’ and Windy meets the twins, whom he already knows, and introduces Johnny. Both men are attracted to Rosemary while Susie becomes even more infatuated with Johnny. Johnny is eventually accepted into the Navy and begins his training hoping for assignment to the ‘U.S.S. Douglas’, the ship on which his father had served with distinction, when its re-fitting has been completed. Rosemary is contemptuous of Johnny’s popularity with the other girls but when she is dining with Windy, Johnny joins them and by a trick arranges for Windy to be escorted out by a couple of Military Policemen. On the way back Johnny sings to Rosemary ‘Let’s Take the Long Way Home’ and Rosemary realises that she is in love with him. 
In order to prevent his leaving to join the ‘Douglas’ Susie submits a suggestion for a show to be produced to aid WAVES recruitment and signs it with Johnny’s name. The suggestion is accepted and Johnny is placed as ‘Chief Specialist’ in charge of it. Thinking that Windy is responsible for the suggestion being put forward in his name Johnny chooses him as his assistant. A show is held aboard ‘U.S.S. Traverse Bay’ and Johnny, as an old postman, and Windy, as a commissionaire, both in black-face, sing ‘Ac-Cent-Tchu-Ate the Positive’ with the help of a chorus of WAVES.

When Rosemary learns from Windy about ‘Johnny’s’ suggestion she thinks he has made it to avoid active service. Johnny manages to get hold of the written suggestion with the intention of showing it to Rosemary to prove it is not his handwriting but Susie gets it from him. Rosemary disbelieves that he had the note and tells him that she is going to leave the show. Windy persuades Susie to don a dark wig and pretend to be Rosemary. In this guise she drinks from a spirits flask (actually cold tea) and is seen kissing Windy in order that Johnny will form an entirely wrong impression of Rosemary. He is thus faced with Rosemary’s disbelief and her apparent preference for Windy. 
When the big show takes place Susie and other WAVES play in a sketch called ‘If WAVES Acted Like Sailors’ in which she sings ‘There’s a Fella Waiting in Poughkeepsie’, Johnny and Windy joining in the last few lines. Johnny, dispirited, writes a note for Windy and leaves. Windy, realising the true feeling between Johnny and Rosemary, explains the circumstances to her and, with Susie, goes after Johnny. Susie confesses to Johnny that it was she who sent in the suggestion and he returns to the show to duet with Rosemary ‘I Promise You’.

The closing chorus number on stage is ‘Here Come the WAVES’ and after the triumphantly successful show is finished arrangements are made for Johnny and Windy to be flown out to join the ‘U.S.S. Douglas’.

Cast

Reception
The film was placed 7th in the list of top-grossing movies in the USA in 1944.

Bosley Crowther of The New York Times commented, inter alia: "Paramount and its favored son, Bing Crosby aren’t going precisely the same way that they went in Mr. Crosby’s last picture ('Going My Way')—and everyone knows which way that was—but they are taking an agreeable turn together in “Here Come the Waves,” which trooped into the Paramount yesterday. They are ambling along that vein of comedy, with vamped-in music, that Mr. Crosby used to rove, and they have Sonny Tufts and Betty Hutton as convivial companions this time. Sure, the traveling is nothing like as charming as it was on that last prize-winning tour, but it offers a few attractive vistas and several gaily amusing jolts... “Accentuate the Positive,” which is sung with Mr. Tufts (sic), is probably the best of the several Harold Arlen and Johnny Mercer tunes. Miss Hutton, in her broader characterization—meaning that of the more rambunctious sis—is also terrific in a gag song called “Strictly on My Own Tonight” (actually "There's a Fella Waiting in Poughkeepsie"). Regarding Miss Hutton’s dual performance, it should not be mistaken for high art, but it certainly can be commended as very vigorous virtuosity... Paramount, in short, has been generous to the service in every respect. But the humor is the best part of the picture—and the best part of the humor is that which has Bing crooning in travesty of a famous “swooner” who shall be nameless (just this once)."
     
The Variety review was favorable too. "A kinda corny title, “Here Come the Waves” manages to surmount the handle and emerges as a tiptop film. Interspersed in Crosby’s nifty songalogy, Johnny Mercer-Harold Arlen have supplied a set of excellent songs, including a dandy novelty in “Accent-Tchu-ate the Positive”; two corking ballads in “Let’s Take the Long Way Home” and “I Promise You,” the latter as a duet with Betty Hutton playing the alter ego...‘Old Black Magic’ is reprised in a delicious rib on Frank Sinatra. Crosby is cast as the new pash crooner, and his mike-clutching stance, accented by the whinnying dames, leaves no secret as to whom Der Bingle refers. It’s a dandy take-off on The Voice, but it’s not harsh; in fact, it’s a sympathetic salve for all out-of-service crooners..."

The film is recognized by American Film Institute in these lists:
 2004: AFI's 100 Years...100 Songs:	
 "Ac-Cent-Tchu-Ate the Positive" – Nominated

Music
The songs were all composed by Harold Arlen & Johnny Mercer.
"Ac-Cent-Tchu-Ate the Positive"
"Got To Wear You Off My Weary Mind"
"I Owe It All To You"
"Here Come the WAVES"
"I Promise You"
"Let's Take the Long Way Home"
"The Navy Song"
"There's a Fella Waiting in Poughkeepsie"
"A Woman's Work Is Never Done"

"My Mama Thinks I'm a Star" was also written for the film but it was not used.

Bing Crosby recorded four of the songs for Decca Records. “Ac-Cent-Tchu-Ate the Positive” was in the Billboard charts for nine weeks with a peak position of #2. Crosby's songs were also included in the Bing's Hollywood series.

See also
List of American films of 1944

References

External links

1944 films
1944 musical comedy films
American musical comedy films
American black-and-white films
1940s English-language films
Films directed by Mark Sandrich
Military humor in film
Paramount Pictures films
Films about the United States Navy
Films scored by Robert Emmett Dolan
American romantic musical films
1940s romantic musical films
WAVES (Navy)
1940s American films